LaDairis G. Jackson (born June 16, 1979) is a former American football defensive end in the National Football League for the Washington Redskins and Cincinnati Bengals.  He played college football at Oregon State University.  He is currently playing for the Chicago Rush in the Arena Football League.

1979 births
Living people
American football defensive ends
Washington Redskins players
Cincinnati Bengals players
Oregon State Beavers football players